Clarence Hampton "Buck" Etchison  (January 27, 1915 – January 24, 1980) was an American professional first baseman who played for the Boston Braves in parts of two seasons spanning 1943–1944.

At the end of the 1945 season, he was sent to the minor league Milwaukee Brewers of the American Association, as one of the players to be named later when the Braves received Dick Culler and Tommy Nelson.

Etchison was born in Baltimore, Maryland, and died at the age of 64 in East New Market, Maryland.

References

External links

1915 births
1980 deaths
Major League Baseball first basemen
Boston Braves players
Minor league baseball managers
Dayton Ducks players
Elmira Pioneers players
Fayetteville Highlanders players
Federalsburg Feds players
Grand Rapids Colts players
Griffin Pimientos players
Harrisburg Senators players
Hartford Bees players
Mahanoy City Bluebirds players
Mahanoy City Brewers players
Milwaukee Brewers (AA) players
Nashville Vols players
Reading Brooks players
Rome Colonels players
Sunbury Yankees players
Welch Miners players
York White Roses players
Youngstown A's players
Baseball players from Baltimore